Tillandsia australis is a species in the genus Tillandsia. This species is native to Bolivia.

Cultivars
 × Vrieslandsia 'Arden's Fireworks'
 × Vrieslandsia 'Twin Brother'

References

BSI Cultivar Registry  Retrieved 11 October 2009

australis
Flora of Bolivia